Starlight Investments is a privately-held Canadian real estate investment and asset management company based in Toronto, Ontario. As of 2021, Starlight owns 70,000 multi-family units (60,000 in Canada and 10,000 in the United States), 8 million square feet of commercial space, and over 600 properties across Canada.

History 
In 2011, Drimmer founded Starlight Investments. In 2012, Drimmer acquired his former company TransGlobe REIT for $1 billion, and also acquired 72 additional buildings with a subsidiary from the Public Sector Pension Investment Board. In February 2020, Starlight bought Northview Apartments REIT.

In 2016, Starlight drew scrutiny from tenants and local politicians around proposed 'renovictions' of tenants. It has also faced other complaints around landlord practices.

The company created a real estate securities investment company, Starlight Capital, in 2018. That November, Starlight Capital announced the Starlight Hybrid Global Real Assets Trust to give retail investors access to a real estate mutual fund.

In January 2021, Starlight purchased the naming rights to a stadium at City Centre Park in Langford after making a sponsorship deal with the city, which saw Bear Mountain Stadium renamed to Starlight Stadium as part of the five-year deal.

In April 2022, Starlight Capital acquired Stone Investment Group, making them the largest owner/operator of purpose-built rental housing in Canada.

In June, Starlight Investments' Canadian Residential Growth Fund III raised CDN $1.2 billion, with 61% of the capital coming from foreign investors. This was the first time foreign investors contributed to one of Starlight's funds.

References

Real estate companies of Canada
Investment companies of Canada
Canadian companies established in 2011
Real estate and property developers
Companies established in the 2010s